

Q 

  (/)
 
  (/)
 
 
 
 USS Queen Charlotte (1813)
 
 
 
  (/)
 
 
 
 
 
  (/)
 
  (/)
 
 
 
 
 
 
 
 

R

 
 
 
 
 
 
 
 
 
 
 
 
 
 
 
 
 
 
 
 
 
 
 
 
 
 
 
 
 
 
 
 
 

Ra

 
  (//)
 
  (/)
  
 
 
 
 
  (/)
 
  (/, /)
 
 
 
 
  (//, /)
 
  (/)
 

 
 
 
 
 
 
 
 
  (/)
  (//)
  (//)
  (/)
 
 
 

  (/)
  (/)
  (/)
  (1814)
 
  (/)
 
 
 
  (/)
 
  (///)
  (/, /)
  (//)
 
 

  (/)
 
 
  (/)
  (/)
  (/)
 
 
 

Re

  (/)
  (/)
  (/)
  (/)
 
  (/)
 
 
  (/, /)
  (//)
 
  (/)
 
  (//)
  (//)
  (/)
  (//)
 
  (/)
  (/)
  (/)
 USNS Redstone (T-AGM-20)
  (//, /)
  (/)
  (//)
 
  (/, /)
 
 
 
 
  (/)
  (/)
  (/)
 
  (/)
 
  (/)
 
 
 
 
 
 
 
 
 
 
 
  (/)
  (/)
  (/)
 
  (/)
  (//AGP-289)
 
 
 
 
 
 
 
  (/)
  (/)
 
 
 
 
 
 
 
 
 
 
 
 
  (/)
  (/)
  (/)
 
  
 

Rh–Ri 

  (/)
 
 
 
  (/)
 
 
 
 
 
 
 
 
 
  (/)
 
 
  (/)
 
 
 
 
 
 
 
 
 
 
  (/)
 
 
 
  (/)
 
 
 
 
 
  (//, /)
 
 
 
 
 
 
 
 
  (//)
 
 
 
 
 
  (/)
 
  (/)
 
 
 
 
 
  (/)
 

Roa–Roe 

 
 
 
  (/)
 
 
 
 
 
 
  (/)
 
 
 
 
 
  
  (//)
  (/)
 
  (///)
 
 
 
 
  (//, /)
 
 
 
 
 
 
  (/)
  (//)
  (////)
  (/)
 
 
  (/)
  (/)
 
  (/)
 
 
 
 
  (/)
 
 
 
 
 

Rog–Roy 

 
 RV Roger Revelle (T-AGOR-24) (Operated by Scripps Institution of Oceanography)
  (/)
  (/)
 
 
 
 
 
 
 
 
 
 
 
 
 
 
  (//)
 
 
 
 
 
  (/)
  (/)
 
 
 
 
 
 
 
  (/)
  (/)
 
 
 
 
 
 
 
 
  (/)
 
 
 
 
 

Ru–Ry 

 
  (//)
 
  (/)
 
  (//)
  (/)

  (/)
  (/)
 
 
 
 
 
 
 
 
 
 
 
 
  (/)
 
  (/)

External links 
 navy.mil: List of homeports and their ships
 Dictionary of American Naval Fighting Ships
  Naval Vessel Register